Limonium tetragonum, the square-stalked sea lavender, is a species of flowering plant in the family Plumbaginaceae. A biennial halophyte, it can be found growing at the high tide line in coastal wetlands and in salt marshes. It is collected in the wild and eaten as a vegetable, and is considered to have medicinal properties. There appears to be an ornamental cultivar, 'Confetti'.

References

tetragonum
Halophytes
Flora of Primorsky Krai
Flora of South Korea
Flora of Japan
Flora of the Ryukyu Islands
Flora of New Caledonia
Plants described in 1949